The Nassau Bahamas Open was a professional golf tournament on the PGA Tour that was held in March 1928. It was played at the Bahamas Country Club in Nassau in The Bahamas.

The US$5,000 tournament was won by Gene Sarazen, who defeated Johnny Farrell in a sudden-death playoff after both had tied with 132 strokes for two rounds.

Winners

References

Former PGA Tour events
Golf tournaments in the Bahamas
Sport in Nassau, Bahamas
1928 in golf
1928 in the Bahamas